This is a list of Estonian football transfers in the winter transfer window 2022–23 by club. Only top-division transfers are included.

This transfer window was open between the 2022 Meistriliiga and the 2023 Meistriliiga season until 3 March 2023. Harju JK Laagri will debut in the league, while TJK Legion will play in a lower division.

Meistriliiga

Flora

In:

 →

 →

 →

Out:

FCI Levadia

In:

 →

Out:

Paide Linnameeskond

In:

 →

Out:

Nõmme Kalju

In:

Out:

Kuressaare

In:

Out:

Tartu Tammeka

In:

Out:

Narva Trans

In:

Out:

Tallinna Kalev

In:

Out:

 ←

Pärnu Vaprus

In:

Out:

Harju JK Laagri

In:

Out:

References

External links
 Official site of the Estonian Football Association
 Official site of the Meistriliiga

Estonian
transfers
transfers
2022–23